Robyn Ellen Hannigan is an American academic in the field of science, and an inventor and entrepreneur.  She is the 19th president of Ursinus College in Collegeville, Pa., having previously served as the provost of Clarkson University.

Hannigan and her colleagues have developed four patents and technologies, including one which resolved an analytical chemistry instrument communication issue, and another which was a medical application technology.

Early life
Hannigan grew up in New Jersey. Her mother was a member of the Narragansett Nation. As a young person, she was an enthusiastic but unsuccessful science student, receiving a D grade in her biology class. Her parents insisted that she attend college, and she obtained a Bachelor of Science degree in biology from The College of New Jersey, despite being a reluctant student. After working for her local health department after graduation, she found that she wanted to pursue higher education.

She went on to receive Master of Arts in geology from SUNY Buffalo, and a Master of Science and Ph.D. in earth and environmental science from the University of Rochester.

Career
Hannigan's previous positions include Founding Dean, School for the Environment, University of Massachusetts Boston; Program Officer, Division of Biological Infrastructure, National Science Foundation; Graduate Program Director, Environmental Science Graduate Program, Arkansas State University; Co-founder and Chief Science Officer, GeoMed Analytical, Boston, Mass.; and co-founder and Chief Science Officer, Hyphenated Solutions, State University Arkansas. She has also held faculty appointments as a professor at the University of Massachusetts Boston and Arkansas State University.

Hannigan is the co-inventor of four patents: Peltier-cooled cryogenic laser ablation cell, Detection of a component of interest with an ultraviolet laser and method of using the same, Oral fluid assays for the detection of heavy metal exposure, and Universal transfer apparatus and method to use same.

Awards
Hannigan is a Fellow of the American Association for the Advancement of Science (2010), a Fellow of the Geological Society of America (2008), a recipient of the Camille and Henry Dreyfus Award for Encouraging Disadvantaged Students into Careers in the Chemical Sciences from the American Chemical Society (2007), and a Fellow of the Aldo Leopold Leadership Program (2001).

References 

Clarkson University faculty
University of Rochester alumni
Year of birth missing (living people)
Living people
American university and college faculty deans
Women deans (academic)
Arkansas State University faculty
University at Buffalo alumni
University of Massachusetts Boston faculty
The College of New Jersey alumni
Fellows of the American Association for the Advancement of Science
Fellows of the Geological Society of America
20th-century Native Americans
21st-century Native Americans
Narragansett people
American women geologists
20th-century Native American women
21st-century Native American women